Psellogrammus  is a genus of freshwater fish in the family Characidae. It contains the single species Psellogrammus kennedyi, which occurs in Argentina, Brazil, and Paraguay.  It is found in the Paraguay and São Francisco River basins.

The fish is named in honor of Clarence Hamilton Kennedy (1879-1952), Eigenmann’s student, later a renowned entomologist, who co-authored work on Paraguayan fishes in which appeared this description.

References
 

Characidae
Monotypic freshwater fish genera
Fish of South America
Fish of Argentina
Fish of Brazil
Fish of Paraguay
Taxa named by Carl H. Eigenmann
Fish described in 1903